Athletics, for the 2017 Island Games, held at the Gutavallen, Visby, Gotland, Sweden in June 2017.

Medal table

Results

Men

Women

References

Island Games
Athletics
2017